The 1991-92 Penn State Nittany Lions men's basketball team represented the Pennsylvania State University during the 1991-92 NCAA Division I men's basketball season. The team was led by 9th-year head coach Bruce Parkhill, and played their home games at Rec Hall in University Park, Pennsylvania.

Schedule

References

Penn State Nittany Lions basketball seasons
Penn State
Penn State
1991 in sports in Pennsylvania
1992 in sports in Pennsylvania